Stefan Schmidt may refer to:

 Stefan Schmidt (footballer, born 1975), Danish footballer
 Stefan Schmidt (footballer, born 1989), German footballer
 Stefan Schmidt (politician) (born 1981), German politician
 Stefan Due Schmidt (born 1994), Danish speed skater

See also
 Stefan Schmid (born 1970), German decathlete